Nassella cernua (syn. Stipa cernua) is a species of grass known by the common name nodding needlegrass.

The bunchgrass is native to western California in the United States and Baja California in Mexico.

Distribution
Nassella cernua is a component of California and Baja California in native grasslands, chaparral, and juniper woodlands.  This bunchgrass is found in the California Coast Ranges and Transverse Ranges (U.S.), and Peninsular Ranges (U.S. & Mexico).

This and many other native grasses of the California Floristic Province have declined because of the encroachment of introduced species of grasses, making native grasslands a very endangered habitat type, and this plant a listed Vulnerable species.

Description
The narrow leaves have a waxy texture.

The panicle is open with bending or nodding branches.

Cultivation
Nassella cernua is cultivated as a drought-tolerant ornamental grass by specialty plant nurseries, for use in native plant and wildlife gardens, drought tolerant landscaping, and for habitat restoration projects.

See also
Native grasses of California

References

External links
USDA Plants Profile for Nassella cernua (nodding needlegrass)
Jepson Manual Treatment — Nassella cernua
Lady Bird Johnson Wildflower Center Native Plant Information Network (NPIN): N. cernua
U.C. Photo gallery — closeup image of flower, showing awns.

cernua
Bunchgrasses of North America
Native grasses of California
Grasses of Mexico
Flora of Baja California
Natural history of the California chaparral and woodlands
Natural history of the California Coast Ranges
Natural history of the Peninsular Ranges
Natural history of the San Francisco Bay Area
Garden plants of North America
Drought-tolerant plants